Greek National Road 31 is a national highway of southern Greece. It connects Aigio with Kalavryta.

31
Roads in Western Greece